{{DISPLAYTITLE:C12H24O11}}
The molecular formula C12H24O11 (molar mass : 344.31 g/mol) may refer to:

 Isomalt
 Lactitol
 Maltitol